Trapania goddardi is a species of sea slug, a dorid nudibranch, a marine gastropod mollusc in the family Goniodorididae.

Distribution
This species was first described from Bahía de Banderas, Mexico.

Description
The body of this goniodorid nudibranch attains 7 mm. It is translucent white in colour, with pale brown mottling and darker brown patches of surface pigment. The lateral papillae, oral tentacles, gills and rhinophores are mottled with light and dark brown like the body.

Ecology
Trapania goddardi probably feeds on Entoprocta which often grow on sponges and other living substrata.

References

Goniodorididae
Gastropods described in 2004